"Mean to Me" is a song co-written and recorded by American country music artist Brett Eldredge. It was released on July 14, 2014, as his fifth single and the fourth single from his debut studio album, Bring You Back.  The song was written by Eldredge and Scooter Carusoe.

The song has sold 477,000 copies in the US as of April 2015.

Critical reception
The website Taste of Country gave the song a positive review, saying that "In a way, ‘Mean to Me’ is Eldredge's answer to a test brought to him after two successful, but sonically similar songs. He needed to go in a different direction or risk boring his fans, and he did. This beautiful ballad makes him all the more interesting."

Music video
The music video was directed by Shane Drake and premiered in September 2014.

Charts

Weekly charts

Year-end charts

Certifications

References

2013 songs
2014 singles
Brett Eldredge songs
Songs written by Brett Eldredge
Song recordings produced by Luke Laird
Atlantic Records singles
Music videos directed by Shane Drake
Songs written by Scooter Carusoe